Joseph Anthony Alutto  (born 1941) served two terms as interim president of Ohio State University located in Columbus, Ohio. He was formerly the dean of Ohio State's Max M. Fisher College of Business.

Alutto was the first member of his family to go to college.  While studying for his bachelor's degree in business administration (1962) at Manhattan College, he drove trucks and worked at a grocery store and a chemical company to pay for his studies. After that he pursued his Master's in industrial relations at the University of Illinois and finished a Ph.D. in organizational behavior at Cornell University. He has worked to become a business management expert.  From 1976 to 1990, he served as the Dean of the SUNY-Buffalo School of Management.  He also served as the President of the American Assembly of Collegiate Schools of Business-The International Association for Management Education from October 1996 - June 1998.  In 1991, he was appointed to be the dean of Ohio State's Max M. Fisher College of Business.

On April 30, 2007, Alutto became an interim executive vice president and provost and succeeded Barbara R. Snyder, who became president of Case Western Reserve University on July 1, 2007. He was responsible for the administration, coordination, and development of all academic functions of the university. After the retirement of Karen Holbrook on June 30, 2007, he was appointed to become the interim president of Ohio State University.  He served until Gordon Gee  assumed the presidency on October 1, 2007.

On June 4, 2013, it was announced that as of July 1, 2013, Alutto would serve as interim president of the Ohio State University following the retirement of E. Gordon Gee. He was succeeded as president on June 30, 2014, by President Michael V. Drake.

Alutto is also a Director of Nationwide Financial Services, M/I Homes, and United Retail Group.

References

External links
Alutto does double duty as president
An interview as the dean of the business school at OSU, "What Sets Them Apart?"
Past Presidents of the Ohio State University

Presidents of Ohio State University
Cornell University School of Industrial and Labor Relations alumni
Ohio State University faculty
Manhattan College alumni
1941 births
Living people